Lisa Chess is a film, television and theatre actress.

Career
Chess is perhaps best known for her recurring role on the American television series Picket Fences and such films as Star Trek: The Motion Picture and The Hollow.

References

External links

Living people
American film actresses
American television actresses
Year of birth missing (living people)
21st-century American women